Vojvodina's demographic history reflects its rich history and its former location at the border of the Ottoman and Habsburg empires and at the confluence of various peoples, making it a hotbed of invasion, colonization, and assimilation processes. Currently there are more than 25 ethnic groups living in Vojvodina and six official languages.

Demographic history

The area of Vojvodina had been inhabited since the Paleolithic period. Indo-European peoples moved into this area during three migration waves, which are dated in 4200 BC, 3300 BC, and 2800 BC respectively. Before the Roman conquest in the 1st century BC, Indo-European peoples of Illyrian, Thracian and Celtic origin inhabited the region.

During the Roman administration (which extended to Syrmia and Banat), the original inhabitants were heavily Romanized, and would later be known as Vlachs. The region of Bačka, which did not belong to the Roman Empire, was populated by Iranian Sarmatians (Iazyges). After the end of Roman rule, the Romanized inhabitants of the area escaped to the Balkan Mountains (where they mixed with South Slavs) as well as the Romanian Carpathians (where they later were known as Romanians).

Vojvodina was invaded by the Turanic nomads such as the Huns and Avars, as well as by the Germanic Goths, Gepids and Lombards, but after their military defeat, they were quickly absorbed by the local (Slavic) population, without leaving much ethnic traces in the region's population.

During the early medieval migrations, Slavs (Severans, Abodrites, Braničevci, Timočani and Serbs) settled today's Vojvodina in the 6th and 7th centuries. According to some sources, pockets of Romanized populations remained in the area. Until the Hungarian conquest in the 10th century, the region had a dominant Slavic population.

The region was conquered by the Principality of Hungary in the 10th century, and Hungarians started to settle in the area. Hungarians mainly settled in the northern part of the region, where they lived mixed with Slavs. Until the late 12th and early 13th century, the region was mainly populated by Slavs, after which the ethnic relations changed in favor of Hungarians. The larger number of Hungarians settled in the region since the 13th century. The presence of Slavs in the area increased again in the 14th century with the arrival of many Serbs from the south. During the Hungarian administration, much of the native local Slavs were Magyarized. Initially, the Hungarian language was spoken only by the knights and nobility of the Kingdom of Hungary, but it was later adopted also by the rest of the population. By the opinion of some researchers, the non-Magyarized descendants of these local Slavs are the present-day Šokci.

Although Serbs were part of the aboriginal Slavic population in the territory of Vojvodina (especially in Syrmia), an increasing number of Serbs began settling from the 14th century onward. Because of the presence of the large Serb population, many historical records and maps from the 15th to the 18th century refer to the territory of present-day Vojvodina as Raška.

The Ottoman Empire took control of Vojvodina in the 16th century, and this caused a massive depopulation of the region. Most of the Hungarians and many local Slavs fled from the region and escaped to the north. The majority of those who left in the region were Serbs, mainly now engaging either in farming or in Ottoman military service.

Under Ottoman policy, many Serbs were newly settled in the region. During the Ottoman administration, Serbs comprised an absolute majority of Vojvodina's population. In that time, villages were populated exclusively by Serbs, while cities were populated by various ethnic and religious groups, including mainly Muslims and Serbs, but also some Cincars, Greeks, Jews and Roma.

The Habsburg monarchy took control of Vojvodina in the treaties of Karlovci (1699) and Požarevac (1718). Following the establishment of the Habsburg administration, the Muslim population fled from the region. Some of these Muslim refugees were resettled in Bosnia and Herzegovina. During the Habsburg administration, many new Serb settlers from the Ottoman Empire immigrated to the region. In 1687, the northern parts of the region were settled by ethnic Bunjevci.

Many other non-Serb settlers were also settled in the territory of present-day Vojvodina during the 18th and 19th century. These settlers were mainly Germans and Hungarians, but also included Rusyns, Slovaks, Romanians, and others. Because of this settling, Serbs were no longer the absolute ethnic majority in the region, and Vojvodina became one of the most ethnically diverse regions of Europe.

Despite this, Serbs still remained the largest ethnic group in the region. According to the 1910 census, Serbs comprised 33.8% of the population in the territory of present-day Vojvodina. After Serbs, the most numerous ethnic groups were Hungarians (comprising 28.1%) and Germans (comprising 21.4%).

In 1918, Vojvodina became part of the Kingdom of Serbs, Croats and Slovenes and new Serb settlers came to the region. As a consequence of the Second World War, most Vojvodina Germans (about 200,000) left Vojvodina together with the defeated German army. Those who remained in the region were confined to prison camps until 1948, when the camps were dissolved and Yugoslav citizenship was returned to the Germans. Despite this, the remaining German population would leave Yugoslavia for economic reasons, moving to Germany, other European countries, or the United States. In their place, new South Slavic (Serb, Montenegrin, Macedonian, Croat, etc.) colonists would settle in the region. According to the 1948 census, Serbs formed the absolute majority in Vojvodina again at 51% of the population, and this percent rose to 65% in the 2002 census. The multi-ethnic character of the region would still persist.

Population data from the Hungarian administration period

9th century
When Hungarians arrived to Central Europe (in 896), this region was populated exclusively by Slavs.

15th century
In the 15th century, according to opinion of various researchers, South Slavic (Serbian and Croatian) population was dominant in Syrmia and southern Banat, while Hungarian population was dominant in Bačka and northern Banat. According to Hungarian author Károly Kocsis, 194,000 inhabitants might have been living on the present-day territory of Vojvodina in 1495. That number was calculated on the basis of work of Kubinyi, A. (1966), who processed the data of the tax inventory conducted in 1495 by Sigismund Ernust, Chancellor of the Royal Treasury. Some 52 townships (civitas, oppidium) and 801 villages could be found in the area, in which, according to Kocsis, Hungarians are likely to have constituted the majority of population. According to this view, the population of the area included 148,000 (76,1%) Hungarians, 39,000 (20%) Serbs and 7,500 (3,9%) Croats.
However, calculation of demographic data from this time period can be described as vague and of a rather varied nature, due to the lack of censuses that would collect comprehensive ethnic information. For the time of the Hungarian royal tax registration in 1495, conclusions for a probable absolute or relative „ethnic" majority of the population living in the area were drawn from the given sources through analysing direct references of „ethnic nature", in most cases by the linguistic analysis of taxpayers' names and that of geographical names.

Population data from the Ottoman administration period
During Ottoman administration (16th–18th century), the region of Vojvodina had an absolute Serb majority.

Population data from the Habsburg administration period

1690
In 1690, about 210,000 Serbs lived in Vojvodina (excluding Srem). In this time, almost entire population of the region was composed of Serbs, also including some Šokci.

1715
According to the Austrian census in Bačka from 1715, Serbs, Bunjevci, and Šokci comprised 97.6% of population.

1718–1720
The 1720 census in Bačka recorded 72% Serbs and 22% Bunjevci and Šokci. After the Treaty of Passarowitz (1718), the first Habsburg census recorded in Banat about 20,000 citizens, mostly Serbs.

1787

1828

1840

1857

1880 census

1890 census

1900 census

1910 census

Note that linguistic data from this census might not correspond with ethnic structure in some settlements (Novi Sad, Subotica, Zrenjanin, etc.), due to the fact that Hungarian language was spoken by several ethnicities (Hungarians, Jews, Bunjevci, etc.).

Population data from the Yugoslav and Serbian administration period

1921 census

1931 census

1941 census
Note: 1941 census data for Bačka was combined with 1931 census data for Banat and Srem.

1948 census

1953 census

1961 census

1971 census

1981 census

1991 census

2002 census

2011 census

Future demographic trends

The general demographic trend in Vojvodina is a natural decrease in population. According to the 2011 census, the average age of the population of the province was 41.8. Ever since 1989, Vojvodina recorded negative natural growth, including all the ethnic groups.  Despite that, number of ethnic Serbs in the province is increasing due to the constant immigration of Serbs from other parts of Serbia as well as Serbs from Republika Srpska and parts of Croatia neighboring Serbia. It is expected that by 2021 census, Serbs become relative majority in Bečej and Čoka municipalities as well as in the city of Subotica itself.

See also
 Ethnic groups of Vojvodina
 Demographic history of Bačka
 Demographic history of Serbian Banat
 Demographic history of Syrmia
 Demographic history of Novi Sad
 Demographic history of Subotica

References

Sources
 
 
 
 Branislav Bukurov; Bačka, Banat i Srem; Novi Sad; 1978.
 Milan Tutorov; Banatska rapsodija – istorika Zrenjanina i Banata; Novi Sad; 2001.
 Borislav Jankulov; Pregled kolonizacije Vojvodine u XVIII i XIX veku; Novi Sad – Pančevo; 2003.
 Károly Kocsis (DSc, University of Miskolc) – Zsolt Bottlik (PhD, Budapest University) – Patrik Tátrai: Etnikai térfolyamatok a Kárpát-medence határon túli régióiban + CD (for detailed data), Magyar Tudományos Akadémia (Hungarian Academy of Sciences) – Földrajtudományi Kutatóintézet (Academy of Geographical Studies); Budapest; 2006.;  (data for 1495–1857)

Further reading

External links
 The Ethnic Structure of the Population in Vojvodina
 Ethnic structure of the population of the present territory of Vojvodina (1880–1991)
 History of Vojvodina (maps)